Denise M. Verret is the director of the Los Angeles Zoo and Botanical Gardens. She is the first female African American director of an Association of Zoos and Aquariums-accredited institution. She also serves on the board of the Association of Zoos and Aquariums and is a zoo accreditation inspector. She spent 19 years as the Los Angeles Zoo's deputy director before assuming the post of director.

Early life
Verret was born and raised in Altadena, California as the middle child of three sisters and attended schools in Pasadena, California, including John Muir High School. Her mother was a homemaker who eventually gained employment as the accounts payable manager at Huntington Memorial Hospital. Verret's father was a detective on the force of the Los Angeles Police Department.

Personal life
Verret is married to Anthony Verret. The couple have two children, Lauren and Brian. Verret has lived in Arcadia since 2002.

Education
Verret majored in Administrative Studies at UC Riverside, graduating in 1988. While still a student, she worked in the university's Office of Early Academic Outreach.

Career
After graduating from the University of California, Riverside, Verret's aunt, who worked for the City of Los Angeles Department of Public Works, encouraged her to pursue an internship with the city. Verret hence obtained an internship in the Office of the City Administrative Officer. She continued to work for the city for several decades, encompassing her time spent as deputy director of the Los Angeles Zoo and other posts. As deputy director, Verret oversaw all areas of the zoo's proceedings including finance, information technology, human resources, administration, admission and guest relations, public relations, planning and development, education, and interpretive programs. She directed and developed the zoo’s strategic and vision plans in this time, also managing the organization's business and marketing plans.

Verret was serving as interim zoo director when Los Angeles Mayor Eric Garcetti nominated her for the position of director; John Lewis, zoo director, had retired in January 2019. Verret was confirmed to the seat of director of the Los Angeles Zoo on June 28, 2019. She previously served 19 years as deputy director of the zoo, with her career totaling 30 years working for the City of Los Angeles.

As zoo director, Verret is charged with overseeing the redesign and redevelopment of the zoo’s 133-acre campus.

References

Zoo directors
University of California, Riverside alumni
Living people
Year of birth missing (living people)
People from Altadena, California
People from Arcadia, California